Nuclear blast may refer to:

 Nuclear explosion
 Nuclear Blast, a record label